Aechmea tayoensis is a species of plant in the family Bromeliaceae. It is endemic to Morona-Santiago Province in Ecuador.  Its natural habitat is subtropical or tropical moist lowland forests.

References

tayoensis
Endemic flora of Ecuador
Endangered plants
Plants described in 1981
Taxonomy articles created by Polbot